Wa Mei Shan is a village in Fanling, in the North District of the New Territories of Hong Kong.

Administration
Wa Mei Shan is a recognized village under the New Territories Small House Policy.

References

External links
 Delineation of area of existing village Wa Mei Shan (Fanling) for election of resident representative (2019 to 2022)

Villages in North District, Hong Kong
Fanling